NA-88 Khushab-II is a constituency for the National Assembly of Pakistan.

Members of Parliament

1988—2002: NA-52 Khushab

2002-2018: NA-70 Khushab-II

2018-2022: NA-94 Khushab-II

Election 2002 

General elections were held on 10 Oct 2002. Malik Muhammad Saifullah Tiwana an Independent candidate won by 60,754 votes.

Election 2008 

The result of general election 2008 in this constituency is given below.

Result 
Malik Shakir Bashir Awan succeeded in the election 2008 and became the member of National Assembly.

Election 2013 

General elections were held on 11 May 2013. Malik Shakir Bashir Awan of PML-N won by 94,594 votes and became the member of National Assembly.

Election 2018 

General elections were held on 25 July 2018.

See also
NA-87 Khushab-I
NA-89 Mianwali-I

References

External links 
Election result's official website

NA-070